Dreams Football Club is a Ghanaian professional football club based in the Greater Accra Region, Ghana. The club is competing in the Ghanaian Premier League.

History
The club was formed in 2009 and was promoted to the second level of the Ghanaian football league system in 2014. The club eventually qualified to the Ghana Premier League in 2015 after emerging winners of Zone 3 in the Division One League. The Club moved its ground to Dawu, for the 2015–16 football season to satisfy requirements of the Ghana Football Association's Club Licensing System. The club however maintains its training ground at Kweiman where it houses most of its players.

The club operates a first team, popularly called Stage 1 and a youth team called Stage 2. Players of Stage 1 are considered first team members and compete in the Ghana Premier League. Stage 1 is managed by former Asante Kotoko trainer and national U20 team coach Abdul Karim Zito. Stage 2 is the feeder club to Stage 1 but are under the trading names Still Believe FC and In God We Trust FC.

Ghana Premier League
Dreams FC sealed their qualification to the 2015–2016 Ghana Premier League season for the first time ever in their history. In December 2016, the club was demoted from the Ghana Premier League due to an anomaly with the registration of a player. The decision was taken by the Ghana Football Association's Disciplinary Committee.

Kit sponsor
The Ghanaian Premier League side signed a partnership deal with kit manufacturing firm, Mayniak Sports Wear.

Current squad

First team

Coaching staff

Managerial history

Management

Honours

National leagues 

GN Bank Division One League: 2015
Division Two League (Greater Accra): 2014

Other competitions 
GHALCA G8 2018: Champions

Notable youth team players 
Dreams Youth Team has produced players such as:
John Antwi of  Misr Lel-Makkasa SC, on loan from Al Ahly SC, in the Egyptian Premier League.
Baba Rahman of  Chelsea, now playing for the Reading F.C on loan
Benjamin Tetteh of Sparta Prague in the Czech First League.
Leonard Owusu of Vancouver Whitecaps FC in the Major League Soccer.
Montari Kamaheni of F.C. Ashdod in the Israeli Premier League.
Emmanuel Lomotey of Extremadura UD, on loan at Villarreal CF B
Lawson Bekui of AC Kajaani in Finland.
Samuel Alabi of F.C. Ashdod in the Israeli Premier League.
Emmanuel Sowah Adjei of KAS Eupen in the Belgian Pro League.

References

External links
 Official club website 
 Worldfootball.net Dreams FC
Dreams FC on soccerway

Sports clubs in Ghana
2009 establishments in Ghana
Football clubs in Ghana
Association football clubs established in 2009
Greater Accra Region
Dreams F.C. (Ghana)